EPER may refer to:
 European Pollutant Emission Register
 European Political Economy Review
 Fiat ePER - a spare parts catalogue of the Fiat group manufacturers